This article lists the albums attributed to the series Lucky Star.

Video game theme and character songs

Lucky Star Vocal Mini Album

 is a video game soundtrack for the video game Lucky Star Moe Drill based on the manga Lucky Star. It was first released on December 22, 2005 in Japan.

Track listing

(All Composition/Arrangement: Shin'ichi Sakurai / Lyrics: Kiyomi Kumano)
 - 4:16
Performed by Ryō Hirohashi, Mai Nakahara, Ami Koshimizu
 - 3:20
Performed by Ai Shimizu, Miyu Matsuki, Satsuki Yukino
 - 3:59
 - 3:22
 - 4:16
 - 3:20
 - 3:59
 - 3:22

Shin Lucky Star Moe Drill ~Tabidachi~: Gomen ne Maxi CD

KAD-002-B1

 is a video game soundtrack for the video game Shin Lucky Star Moe Drill Tabidachi based on the manga Lucky Star. It was first released on May 24, 2007 with the game package in Japan. Konata Izumi has a solo version of "Lucky Lucky Everybody" on this CD.

Track listing
(All Composition/Arrangement: Shin'ichi Sakurai / Lyrics: Kiyomi Kumano)

Performed by Ryō Hirohashi, Mai Nakahara, Ami Koshimizu

Performed by Mamiko Noto, Yukari Tamura

Performed by Ryō Hirohashi

KAD-002-B2

 is a video game soundtrack for the video game Shin Lucky Star Moe Drill Tabidachi based on the manga Lucky Star. It was first released on May 24, 2007 with the game package in Japan. Kagami Hiiragi has a solo version of "Lucky Lucky Everybody" on this CD.

Track listing

Performed by Ami Koshimizu

KAD-002-B3

 is a video game soundtrack for the video game Shin Lucky Star Moe Drill Tabidachi based on the manga Lucky Star. It was first released on May 24, 2007 with the game package in Japan. Hinata Miyakawa has a solo version of "Lucky Suki Yeah!" on this CD.

Track listing

Performed by Mamiko Noto

Hamatte Sabotte Oh My God!

 is a single containing the opening and ending themes for the PlayStation 2 visual novel adaptation of Lucky Star, Lucky Star: Ryōō Gakuen Ōtōsai.

Track listing

 - 4:27
Composition/Arrangement: Satoru Kōsaki
Lyrics: Aki Hata
 - 4:12
Composition/Arrangement: nishi-ken
Lyrics: Aki Hata
 - 4:27
 - 4:12

Na.Ri.A.Ga.Ri

 is a single containing the opening and ending themes for the PlayStation Portable SLG adaptation of Lucky Star, Lucky Star: Net Idol Meister.

Track listing

(All Composition/Arrangement: Ken'ichi Maeyamada / Lyrics: Aki Hata)
 - 4:18
 - 3:24
 - 4:18
 - 3:24

Anime theme and character songs

Motteke! Sailor Fuku

 is a single by Aya Hirano, Emiri Katō, Kaori Fukuhara, and Aya Endō which was used as the opening theme to the anime Lucky Star. It was released on May 23, 2007 by Lantis. Upon its release, the single reached the number two spot on the weekly Oricon charts. The opening video of the anime contains this song and a choreographed dance routine.  It too gained popularity via the Internet, being frequently the subject of parody and some fans considered it to be the next "Hare Hare Yukai"; both sequences were animated by the same studio – Kyoto Animation. In 2007, "Motteke! Sailor Fuku" won the Radio Kansai Award, a subset of the Animation Kobe Theme Song Award. The song was used in the Japanese Wii video game Taiko no Tatsujin.

Track listing

 – 4:18
Composition/Arrangement: Satoru Kōsaki
Lyrics: Aki Hata
 – 4:06
Composition/Arrangement: nishi-ken
Lyrics: Aki Hata
 – 4:18
 – 4:06

Lucky Star Ending Theme Collection

 is an album containing the first twelve ending themes of the anime Lucky Star by Aya Hirano, Emiri Katō, Kaori Fukuhara, and Aya Endō. The album was released on July 11, 2007 by Lantis. The first twelve tracks are the versions played in the anime, and the last thirteen are the full-length versions; the only track that did not have a TV-size version on this album was "Go! Godman".

Track listing

 - 1:30
 - 1:30
 - 1:30
 - 1:30
 - 1:30
 - 1:30
 - 1:30
 - 1:30
 - 1:30
 - 1:30
 - 1:30
 - 1:30
 - 2:55
Performed by Aya Hirano
Composition/Arrangement: Shunsuke Kikuchi
Lyrics: Shōtarō Ishinomori
 - 3:10
Performed by Aya Hirano
Composition/Arrangement: Michiaki Watanabe
Lyrics: Shōtarō Ishinomori
 - 5:11
Performed by Aya Hirano
Composition/Arrangement: Sin
Lyrics: Mikuni Shimokawa
 - 4:28
Performed by Emiri Katō
Composition: Takao Kisugi
Arrangement: Masaru Hoshi
Lyrics: Etsuko Kisugi
 - 3:17
Performed by Aya Hirano
Composition: Chiho Kiyooka
Arrangement: Kenji Yamamoto
Lyrics: Yukinojō Mori
 - 3:32
Performed by Kaori Fukuhara
Composition: Hiroaki Sei
Arrangement: Jun Satō
Lyrics: Yasushi Akimoto
 - 5:09
Performed by Aya Endō
Composition/Lyrics: Miyuki Nakajima
Arrangement: Ichizō Seo
 - 4:46
Performed by Aya Hirano
Composition: Yukihide Takekawa
Arrangement: Mickie Yoshino
Lyrics: Yōko Narahashi
 - 3:40
Performed by Aya Hirano
Composition/Lyrics: Toshihiko Takamizawa
Arrangement: Akira Inoue
 - 5:32
Performed by Emiri Katō
Composition/Arrangement/Lyrics: Tetsuya Komuro
 - 2:59
Performed by Aya Hirano, Emiri Katō, Kaori Fukuhara, Aya Endō
Composition/Arrangement: Shunsuke Kikuchi
Lyrics: Kakumi Kusube
Complement lyrics: Susumu Baba
 - 2:53
Performed by Aya Hirano
Composition: Takeo Yamashita
Arrangement: Masakazu Hirose
Lyrics: Kōnosuke Fuji
 - 3:44
Performed by Aya Hirano, Emiri Katō, Kaori Fukuhara, Aya Endō
Composition: Tetsurō Oda
Arrangement: Takeshi Hayama
Lyrics: Izumi Sakai

Aimai Net Darling

 is a maxi single containing songs sung by Hiromi Konno, and Minoru Shiraishi of the Lucky Channel segment at the end of each episode of Lucky Star. The single was released on July 25, 2007 by Lantis.

Track listing

(All Composition/Arrangement: Satoru Kōsaki / Lyrics: Aki Hata)
 - 4:14
 - 5:31
 - 4:14
 - 5:31

Motteke! Sailor Fuku Re-mix 001

 is a remix album of Motteke! Sailor Fuku, the single album containing the opening theme of the anime series Lucky Star. The remix single was released on August 8, 2007 by Lantis. This album was ranked number three the week of August 12, 2007 after selling 30,000 units.

Track listing

(All Composition: Satoru Kōsaki / Lyrics: Aki Hata)
 - 4:15
Remixed by eicheph (Hideyuki Fukasawa)
 - 3:40
Remixed by Raito
 - 5:27
Remixed by bassjack (Hideyuki Fukasawa)
 - 6:14
Remixed by Susumu Kayamori@Mosaic.wav
 - 3:28
Remixed by Nanashi san (Hideyuki Fukasawa)
 - 6:14
Remixed by Masaya Koike@4-Ever
 - 6:15
Remixed by eicheph (Hideyuki Fukasawa)

Cosutte! Oh My Honey

 is a maxi single released for the anime series Lucky Star on August 29, 2007 by Lantis. The single is a duet album with the two artists Aya Hirano who plays Konata Izumi, and Nozomi Sasaki who plays Patricia Martin. An image of the cover art was viewable in episode sixteen of the anime series.

Track listing

(All Composition/Arrangement: Satoru Kōsaki / Lyrics: Aki Hata)
 - 4:40
 - 3:37
 - 4:40
 - 3:37

Misoji Misaki

 is a maxi single by Hiromi Konno who plays Akira Kogami from the anime series Lucky Star. The single was released on August 29, 2007 by Lantis. "Misoji Misaki" was the ending theme for the sixteenth episode of Lucky Star.

Track listing

(All Composition/Arrangement: Satoru Kōsaki / Lyrics: Aki Hata)
 - 4:16
 - 4:16
 - 4:16
 - 4:16

Character song singles
The following character song albums are sung by the voice actors of both the main cast as well as the supporting cast of characters. There are thirteen character albums in all.

The first four albums released include songs by Aya Hirano as Konata Izumi, Emiri Katō as Kagami Hiiragi, Kaori Fukuhara as Tsukasa Hiiragi, and Aya Endō as Miyuki Takara; these four albums were released on September 5, 2007. The next four released include songs by Shizuka Hasegawa as Yutaka Kobayakawa, Minori Chihara as Minami Iwasaki, Kaori Shimizu as Hiyori Tamura, and Nozomi Sasaki as Patricia Martin; these four albums were released on September 26, 2007. The ninth album was a duet with Kaoru Mizuhara as Misao Kusakabe, and Mai Aizawa as Ayano Minegishi which was released on October 24, 2007. The tenth was  a trio between Aya Hirano, Shizuka Hasegawa, and Minori Chihara as Konata, Yutaka, and Minami respectively which was released on October 24, 2007. The eleventh album was another duet between Hirokazu Hiramatsu as Sōjirō Izumi, and Sumi Shimamoto as Kanata Izumi which was released on November 21, 2007. The twelfth album was a duet with Saori Nishihara as Yui Narumi, and Konomi Maeda as Nanako Kuroi which was also released on November 21, 2007. The last album is a solo featuring Kaoru Mizuhara as Misao and was released on March 26, 2008.

Konata Izumi

 is the first volume of the character song albums and was released on September 5, 2007. The term 'dondake' in the song title "Dondake Fanfare" is a term in Osaka dialect which is used to express surprise at a large amount of something (generally positively) that was popularized through many comedians and J-Pop artists, and thus would equate in English as, "What the?!"

Track listing
 – 4:08
Composition: Yukari Hashimoto
Arrangement: nishi-ken
Lyrics: Aki Hata
 – 4:54
Composition/Arrangement: nishi-ken
Lyrics: Aki Hata
"Loading_Konata_Speaking" – 0:51
Track maker: r-midwest
 – 4:08
 – 4:54

Kagami Hiiragi

 is the second volume of the character song albums and was released on September 5, 2007. The song peaked at number 9 on Oricon's charts.

Track listing
 – 3:43
Composition: Keiji Ayahara
Arrangement: nishi-ken
Lyrics: Aki Hata
 – 3:53
Composition: Tomokazu Tashiro
Arrangement: Yukari Hashimoto
Lyrics: Aki Hata
"I'm sorry by kagami" – 1:04
Track maker: r-midwest
 – 3:43
 – 3:53

Tsukasa Hiiragi

 is the third volume of the character song albums and was released on September 5, 2007.

Track listing
 – 4:33
Composition: Isao
Arrangement: nishi-ken
Lyrics: Aki Hata
 – 4:09
Composition: Shinji Tamura
Arrangement: Hideyuki Fukazawa
Lyrics: Aki Hata
"yume-tsukasa-night-loopin'" – 0:55
Track maker: Raito
 – 4:33
 – 4:09

Miyuki Takara

 is the fourth volume of the character song albums and was released on September 5, 2007.

Track listing
 – 4:49
Composition: Katsumi Tomono
Lyrics: Aki Hata
Arrangement: Satoru Kōsaki
 – 3:48
Composition/Arrangement: Tomoki Kikuya
Lyrics: Aki Hata
"Rhyme of miyuki continued" – 0:59
Track maker: Raito
 – 4:49
 – 3:48

Yutaka Kobayakawa

 is the fifth volume of the character song albums and was released on September 26, 2007.

Track listing
 – 4:24
Lyrics: Aki Hata
Composition/Arrangement: Tomoki Kikuya
 – 4:12
Composition: Isao
Lyrics: Aki Hata
Arrangement: tetsu-yeah
"i-Free Tempo U-taka apartmentronik" – 1:24
Track maker: r-midwest
 – 4:24
 – 4:12

Minami Iwasaki

 is the sixth volume of the character song albums and was released on September 26, 2007.

Track listing
 – 4:41
Composition: Keiji Ayahara
Arrangement: Akio Kondō
Lyrics: Aki Hata
 – 4:30
Composition: rino
Arrangement: Nijine (Akito Matsuda)
Lyrics: Aki Hata
"mokutt minami growing" – 1:11
Track maker: r-midwest
 – 4:41
 – 4:30

Hiyori Tamura

 is the seventh volume of the character song albums and was released on September 26, 2007.

Track listing
 – 3:57
Composition: Tomokazu Tashiro
Arrangement: Takahiro Andō
Lyrics: Aki Hata
 – 3:48
Composition/Arrangement: Yamato Itō
Lyrics: Aki Hata
"he_yo_reason&mechanique" – 1:36
Track maker: A-bee
 – 3:57
 – 3:48

Patricia Martin

 is the eighth volume of the character song albums and was released on September 26, 2007.

Track listing
 – 4:24
Composition: Kōsuke Kanai
Arrangement: Masaya Koike
Lyrics: Aki Hata
 – 4:47
Composition/Arrangement: Satoru Kōsaki
Lyrics: Aki Hata
"pa pa pa pa patti" – 1:17
Track maker: Raito
 – 4:24
 – 4:47

Misao Kusakabe and Ayano Minegishi

 is the ninth volume of the character song albums and was released on October 31, 2007.

Track listing
 – 4:45
Composition/Arrangement: nishi-ken
Lyrics: Aki Hata
 – 4:16
Composition/Arrangement: nishi-ken
Lyrics: Aki Hata
"aYa miSa post modern & ambients"— 1:48
Track maker: A-bee
 – 4:45
 – 4:16

Konata, Yutaka, and Minami

 is the tenth volume of the character song albums and was released on October 31, 2007. The CD's title loosely means Flat-Chested Girls, and the title of the song "Minna de 5ji Pittan", is a play on the game Mojipittan.

Track listing
 – 4:48
Lyrics: Aki Hata
Composition/Arrangement: Satoru Kōsaki
 – 3:59
Lyrics: Aki Hata
Composition/Arrangement: Satoru Kōsaki
"kona-yta-mina-tangs be Altered Scale"— 1:59
Track maker: r-midwest
 – 4:48
 – 3:59

Sōjirō and Kanata Izumi

 is the eleventh volume of the character song albums and was released on November 21, 2007. "I Wish for Happiness from the Yonder" was featured in episode twenty-two of the anime as an instrumental score, during Kanata's introduction as a ghost.

Track listing
 –  5:36
Performed by Sumi Shimamoto
Composition/Arrangement: Satoru Kōsaki
Lyrics: Aki Hata
 – 4:21
Performed by Hirokazu Hiramatsu
Composition/Arrangement: Kōsuke Kanai
Lyrics: Aki Hata
 – 4:14
Performed by Sumi Shimamoto and Hirokazu Hiramatsu
Composition: rino
Arrangement: Tomoki Kikuya
Lyrics: Aki Hata
 –  5:36
 – 4:21
 – 4:11

Yui Narumi and Nanako Kuroi

 is the twelfth volume of the character songs albums and was released on November 21, 2007.

Track listing
 – 3:54
Composition/Arrangement: Kōsuke Kanai
Lyrics: Aki Hata
 – 4:00
Composition/Arrangement/Lyrics: Yamato Itō
"yui's_Hundred_Days_Nana's_Bells" – 1:10
Track maker: r-midwest
 – 3:54
 – 3:57

Misao Kusakabe

 is the thirteenth volume of the character song albums and was released on March 26, 2008.

Track listing
 – 3:25
Composition: Keiji Ayahara
Arrangement: Dai Murai
Lyrics: Aki Hata
 – 4:06
Composition: Keiji Ayahara
Arrangement: Akio Kondō
Lyrics: Aki Hata
"micro Krafty datteValator/AD++" – 2:39
Track maker: Yasushi.K
 – 3:24
 – 4:03

Shiraishi Minoru no Otoko no Lullaby

 is an album for the anime series Lucky Star released on October 10, 2007 by Lantis and contains the ending themes from episode thirteen onwards that were sung by Minoru Shiraishi.

Track listing

 - 1:30
Composition/Lyrics: Minoru Shiraishi
 - 1:30
Composition: Tomokazu Tashiro
Lyrics: Aki Hata
 - 1:10
Composition: Satoru Kōsaki
Lyrics: Minoru Shiraishi
 - 1:20
Composition:Satoru Kōsaki
Lyrics: Minoru Shiraishi
 - 1:30
Composition/Lyrics: Minoru Shiraishi
 - 1:30
Composition/Lyrics: Minoru Shiraishi
 - 1:30
Composition/Lyrics: Minoru Shiraishi
 - 1:30
Composition/Lyrics: Minoru Shiraishi
 - 1:30
 - 1:30
Composition: Satoru Kōsaki 
 - 1:30
Composition: Ryō Matsuda
Lyrics: Yoshiko Miura
 - 5:05
Composition/Lyrics: Minoru Shiraishi
Arrangement: Satoru Kōsaki
 - 4:19
Composition/Lyrics: Minoru Shiraishi
Arrangement: Satoru Kōsaki
 - 5:27
Composition/Lyrics: Minoru Shiraishi
Arrangement: Satoru Kōsaki
 - 5:25
Composition: Satoru Kōsaki
Arrangement: Masaki Suzuki
Lyrics: Minoru Shiraishi
 - 1:31
Composition/Lyrics: Minoru Shiraishi
 - 1:29
Composition/Lyrics: Minoru Shiraishi
 - 1:22
Composition/Lyrics: Minoru Shiraishi
 - 1:26
Composition/Lyrics: Minoru Shiraishi
 - 0:28

Lucky Star Re-Mix002

 is the second remix album for the anime series Lucky Star released on December 26, 2007, by Lantis. In addition to various remixes of the opening theme Motteke! Sailor Fuku (including one version sung by the group JAM Project), the album also features a compilation track featuring songs from an assortment of both the BGM & Radio Bangumi soundtracks and the character song albums.

Track listing

 - 4:16
Performed by JAM Project
Composition/Arrangement: Satoru Kōsaki
Lyrics: Aki Hata
 - 4:57
Remixed by Technoboys Pulcraft Green-Fund
Composition: Satoru Kōsaki
Lyrics: Aki Hata
 - 5:41
Remixed by A-bee
Composition: Satoru Kōsaki
Lyrics: Aki Hata
 - 5:51
Remixed by Ryosuke Nakanishi a.k.a. r-midwest
Composition: Satoru Kōsaki
Lyrics: Aki Hata
 - 5:21
Remixed by Ryosuke Nakanishi a.k.a. r-midwest
Composition: Satoru Kōsaki
Lyrics: Aki Hata
 - 15:31
Performed by 
Composition: Satoru Kōsaki, nishi-ken, Minoru Shiraishi, Keiji Ayahara, Katsumi Tomono, Tomoki Kikuya, Tomokazu Tashiro and Kōsuke Kanai
Arrangement: Satoru Kōsaki
Lyrics: Aki Hata (Satoru Kōsaki and Minoru Shiraishi)

BPM200 Rock'N'Roll Show
Characters of Lucky Star are a guest participating in the jacket and the first song {{Nihongo|"Danshi Murimuri Daikaizō"|男子ムリムリ大改造}}, performed by Aya Hirano, Emiri Katō, Kaori Fukuhara and Aya Endō, lyrics by Aki Hata, composition by milktub and arrangement by ms-jacky.

Ai o Torimodose!!

 is a single by Uchōten (Hiromi Konno and Minoru Shiraishi) which was used as the ending theme to the anime Lucky Star OVA. It's a cover of Fist of the North Star.

Track listing

Lyrics:  Kimiharu Namakura
Composition: Michio Yamashita
Arrangement: Satoru Kōsaki

Lyrics:  Hidetoshi Nomoto and Masayuki Tanaka
Composition: Hiromi Imakiire
Arrangement: Nijine (Akito Matsuda)
 - 4:14
Remix By A-bee
Composition: Satoru Kōsaki
Lyrics: Aki Hata

Lucky Star Music Fair

 is a compilation album for the anime series Lucky Star released on October 22, 2008 by Lantis, containing a variety of remixes and original songs featured from the anime.

Track listing

 - 4:44
Performed by Uchōten (Hiromi Konno and Minoru Shiraishi)
Lyrics:  Aki Hata
Composition/Arrangement: Satoru Kōsaki
 - 5:22
Performed by Uchōten (Hiromi Konno and Minoru Shiraishi)
Composition/Arrangement: Yasushi.K
"Gravity" - 4:19
Performed by m.o.e.v
Composition/Arrangement/Lyrics: Satoru Kōsaki
 - 0:15
Composition: Satoru Kōsaki
Arrangement: hush-a-bye baby
 - 4:51
Performed by Hiromi Konno
Lyrics:  Aki Hata
Composition/Arrangement: Satoru Kōsaki
 - 5:06
Lyrics:  Aki Hata
Composition: Satoru Kōsaki, Isao, Kōsuke Kanai, Yamato Itō and nishi-ken
 - 4:13
Performed by Tomokazu Seki
Lyrics:  Aki Hata
Composition/Arrangement: Satoru Kōsaki
 - 4:05
Performed by Nozomi Sasaki
Composition/Arrangement: Raito
 - 4:40
Performed by Minoru Shiraishi（Minoru Shiraishi）
Composition/Lyrics: Minoru Shiraishi
Arrangement: Satoru Kōsaki
 - 0:26
Composition: Minoru Shiraishi
Arrangement: hush-a-bye baby
 - 4:39
Performed by Minoru Shiraishi
Composition/Lyrics: Minoru Shiraishi
Arrangement: Satoru Kōsaki
 - 4:28
Performed by Minoru Shiraishi
Composition/Lyrics: Minoru Shiraishi
Arrangement: Tatsuya Kikuchi（marble）

Lucky Racer/Real StarLucky☆Racer/Real Star☆ is a single by Sayaka Sasaki which was used as the opening and ending theme to the Variety show Lucky Racer.

Track listing

"Lucky☆Racer" - 4:15
Composition: Tatsh (Tatsuya Shimizu)
Arrangement: Kyō Takada
Lyrics: Sayaka Sasaki
"Real Star☆" - 3:32
Composition: Shunryū
Arrangement: Katsuyuki Harada
Lyrics: Sayaka Sasaki
"Lucky☆Racer" (off vocal) - 4:15
"Real Star☆" (off vocal) - 3:32

 MAKEGUMI MAKEGUMI is a single by Maina Shimagata and Koto Kawasaki which was used as the ending theme to the web anime Miyakawa-ke no Kūfuku.

Track listing

(All Composition/Arrangement/Lyrics: Ken'ichi Maeyamada)
"MAKEGUMI" - 3:53
 - 4:19
"MAKEGUMI" (off vocal) - 3:53
 - 4:17

 KACHIGUMI KACHIGUMI is a single by Aya Hirano and Emiri Katō which was used as the opening theme to the web anime Miyakawa-ke no Kūfuku.

Anime soundtracks

BGM & Radio Bangumi "Lucky Channel" soundtracks

Volume 1

 is the first such album containing background music tracks and radio segments from the anime version of Lucky Star, which was released on June 22, 2007 with the first DVD. The first five tracks are BGM tracks from the anime, all composition are Satoru Kōsaki, and the last six are from radio segments from Radio Program "Lucky Channel" with Hiromi Konno as Akira Kogami and Minoru Shiraishi as himself.

Track listing

Volume 2

 is the second such album containing background music tracks and radio segments from the anime version of Lucky Star, which was released on July 27, 2007 with the second DVD. The first six tracks are BGM tracks from the anime, all composition are Satoru Kōsaki, and the last six are from radio segments from Radio Program "Lucky Channel" with Hiromi Konno as Akira Kogami and Minoru Shiraishi as himself.

Track listing

Volume 3

 is the third such album containing background music tracks and radio segments from the anime version of Lucky Star, which was released on August 24, 2007 with the third DVD. The first seven tracks are BGM tracks from the anime, all composition are Satoru Kōsaki, and the last six are from radio segments from Radio Program "Lucky Channel" with Hiromi Konno as Akira Kogami and Minoru Shiraishi as himself.

Track listing
"Gravity"
Performed by m.o.e.v
Composition/Arrangement/Lyrics: Satoru Kōsaki

Volume 4

 is the fourth such album containing background music tracks and radio segments from the anime version of Lucky Star, which was released on September 28, 2007 with the fourth DVD. The first five tracks are BGM tracks from the anime, all composition are Satoru Kōsaki with the exception of what is noted, and the last six are from radio segments from Radio Program "Lucky Channel" with Hiromi Konno as Akira Kogami and Minoru Shiraishi as himself.

Track listing

Tracks Suite: Joy to the World, Twinkle Twinkle Little Star
Arrangement: Satoru Kōsaki

Tracks Suite: Twinkle Twinkle Little Star
Arrangement: Satoru Kōsaki

Volume 5

 is the fifth such album containing background music tracks and radio segments from the anime version of Lucky Star, which was released on October 26, 2007 with the fifth DVD. The first five tracks are BGM tracks from the anime, all composition are Satoru Kōsaki with the exception of what is noted, and the last six are from radio segments from Radio Program "Lucky Channel" with Hiromi Konno as Akira Kogami and Minoru Shiraishi as himself.

Track listing

Composition: Tomokazu Tashiro
Arrangement: Satoru Kōsaki

Composition: Johann Pachelbel
Arrangement: Satoru Kōsaki

Volume 6

 is the sixth such album containing background music tracks and radio segments from the anime version of Lucky Star, which was released on November 22, 2007 with the sixth DVD. The first six tracks are BGM tracks from the anime, all composition are Satoru Kōsaki, and the last six are from radio segments from Radio Program "Lucky Channel" with Hiromi Konno as Akira Kogami and Minoru Shiraishi as himself.

Track listing

"1974"

Volume 7

 is the seventh such album containing background music tracks and radio segments from the anime version of Lucky Star, which was released on December 21, 2007 with the seventh DVD. The first six tracks are BGM tracks from the anime, all composition are Satoru Kōsaki, and the last six are from radio segments from Radio Program "Lucky Channel" with Hiromi Konno as Akira Kogami and Minoru Shiraishi as himself.

Track listing

Volume 8

 is the eighth such album containing background music tracks and radio segments from the anime version of Lucky Star, which was released with the eighth DVD. The first seven tracks are BGM tracks from the anime, all composition are Satoru Kōsaki, and the last six are from radio segments from Radio Program "Lucky Channel" with Hiromi Konno as Akira Kogami and Minoru Shiraishi as himself.

Track listing

Volume 9

 is the ninth such album containing background music tracks and radio segments from the anime version of Lucky Star, which was released with the ninth DVD. The first eight tracks are BGM tracks from the anime, all composition are Satoru Kōsaki, and the last six are from radio segments from Radio Program "Lucky Channel" with Hiromi Konno as Akira Kogami and Minoru Shiraishi as himself.

Track listing

Cast (Radio)
Akira Kogami - Hiromi Konno
Minoru Shiraishi - Minoru Shiraishi
Meito Anizawa - Tomokazu Seki

Volume 10

 is the tenth album containing background music tracks and radio segments from the anime version of Lucky Star, which was released with the tenth DVD. The first nine tracks are BGM tracks from the anime, all composition are Satoru Kōsaki, and the last six are from radio segments from Radio Program "Lucky Channel" with Hiromi Konno as Akira Kogami and Minoru Shiraishi as himself.

Track listing

Cast (Radio)
Akira Kogami - Hiromi Konno
Minoru Shiraishi - Minoru Shiraishi
Daisuke Ono - Daisuke Ono

Volume 11

 is the eleventh album containing background music tracks and radio segments from the anime version of Lucky Star, which was released with the eleventh DVD. The first six tracks are BGM tracks from the anime, all composition are Satoru Kōsaki, and the last six are from radio segments from Radio Program "Lucky Channel" with Hiromi Konno as Akira Kogami and Minoru Shiraishi as himself.

Track listing

Cast (Radio)
Akira Kogami - Hiromi Konno
Minoru Shiraishi - Minoru Shiraishi
Daisuke Ono - Daisuke Ono
Sigeru Saitō (Director)
Keisuke Sugawara (Assistant Producer)
Kagami Hiiragi - Emiri Katō
Tsukasa Hiiragi - Kaori Fukuhara

Volume 12

 is the twelfth such album containing background music tracks and radio segments from the anime version of Lucky Star, which was released on May 23, 2008 with the twelfth DVD. The first eleven tracks are BGM tracks from the anime, all composition are Satoru Kōsaki, and the last seven are from radio segments from Radio Program "Lucky Channel" with Hiromi Konno as Akira Kogami and Minoru Shiraishi as himself.

Track listing

"ACE BATTLE"

Cast (Radio)
Akira Kogami - Hiromi Konno
Minoru Shiraishi - Minoru Shiraishi
Misao Kusakabe - Kaoru Mizuhara
Kagami Hiiragi - Emiri Katō
Tsukasa Hiiragi - Kaori Fukuhara
Yasuhiro Takemoto
Cherry (Kagami Yoshimizu's family dog)

 Lucky Star OVA BGM soundtrack 

 is the album containing background music tracks from the Lucky Star OVA, which was released on September 26, 2008 with the Lucky Star OVA DVD. All composition are Satoru Kōsaki with the exception of what is noted.

Track listing

Performed by Kaori Fukuhara
Lyrics: Tokyo Movie Planning Department
Composition: Takeo Watanabe
Arrangement: Satoru Kōsaki

Drama CD

Drama CD Lucky Star

 is a drama CD based on the manga Lucky Star which was first released on August 24, 2005 in Japan.

Track listing

"

Cast

Konata Izumi - Ryō Hirohashi
Tsukasa Hiiragi - Mai Nakahara
Kagami Hiiragi - Ami Koshimizu
Miyuki Takara - Erina Nakayama
Nanako Kuroi - Masumi Asano
Yui Narumi - Chiwa Saito
Yutaka Kobayakawa - Ai Shimizu
Minami Iwasaki - Miyu Matsuki
Patricia Martin - Satsuki Yukino
Station staff - Motoyuki Kawahara
Event staff - Katsuya Miyamoto

Lucky Star Moe Drill: Shudaika Iri Drama CD

 is a drama CD based on the video game Lucky Star Moe Drill which was first released on December 1, 2005 with the game package in Japan.

Cast

Konata Izumi - Ryō Hirohashi
Tsukasa Hiiragi - Mai Nakahara
Kagami Hiiragi - Ami Koshimizu
Miyuki Takara - Erina Nakayama
Yutaka Kobayakawa - Ai Shimizu
Minami Iwasaki - Miyu Matsuki
Patricia Martin - Satsuki Yukino
Hinata Miyakawa - Mamiko Noto
Hikage Miyakawa - Yukari Tamura

Shin Lucky☆Star Moe Drill ~Tabidachi~: Original Drama CD

 is a drama CD based on the video game Shin Lucky☆Star Moe Drill ~Tabidachi~ which was first released on May 24, 2007 with the game package in Japan.

Cast

Konata Izumi - Ryō Hirohashi
Kagami Hiiragi - Ami Koshimizu
Miyuki Takara - Erina Nakayama
Misao Kusakabe - Mikako Takahashi
Ayano Minegishi - Yūko Gotō
Yutaka Kobayakawa - Ai Shimizu
Minami Iwasaki - Miyu Matsuki
Hiyori Tamura - Ryōko Shintani
Hikaru Sakuraba - Yuki Matsuoka
Akira Kogami - Ai Nonaka

Lucky Star Drama CD (Drama ga Complete na Disk)

 is a drama CD based on the TV anime Lucky Star which was first released on August 27, 2008 in Japan.

Cast

Konata Izumi - Aya Hirano
Kagami Hiiragi - Emiri Katō
Tsukasa Hiiragi - Kaori Fukuhara
Miyuki Takara - Aya Endō
Yutaka Kobayakawa - Shizuka Hasegawa
Minami Iwasaki - Minori Chihara
Hiyori Tamura - Kaori Shimizu
Patricia Martin - Nozomi Sasaki
Misao Kusakabe - Kaoru Mizuhara
Ayano Minegishi - Mai Aizawa
Yui Narumi - Saori Nishihara
Nanako Kuroi - Konomi Maeda
Sōjirō Izumi - Hirokazu Hiramatsu
Tadao Hiiragi - Tōru Furusawa
Miki Hiiragi - Kikuko Inoue
Inori Hiiragi - Nozomi Masu
Matsuri Hiiragi - Satomi Akesaka
Hikage Miyakawa - Yui Kano
Hinata Miyakawa - Sachiko Takaguchi
Hikaru Sakuraba - Miki Inoue
Akira Kogami - Hiromi Konno
Minoru Shiraishi - Minoru Shiraishi
Other - Fumihiko Tachiki, Kujira

Lucky Star: Ryōō Gakuen Ōtōsai Portable: Situation Voice CD

 is a drama CD based on the video game Lucky Star: Ryōō Gakuen Ōtōsai Portable which was first released on December 23, 2010 with the game package in Japan.

Track listing

Cast

Konata Izumi - Aya Hirano
Kagami Hiiragi - Emiri Katō
Tsukasa Hiiragi - Kaori Fukuhara
Miyuki Takara - Aya Endō

Miyakawa Hinata no Ichinichi

 is a drama CD based on the web anime Miyakawa-ke no Kūfuku which was first released on June 10, 2013 with the "Comptiq" July 2013 issue in Japan.

Cast

Hinata Miyakawa - Maina Shimagata
Hikage Miyakawa - Koto Kawasaki
Meito Anizawa - Tomokazu Seki
Clerk Sugita - Tomokazu Sugita
Clerk Ono - Daisuke Ono
Salesman - Hiro Shimono
Male customers - Fumihiko Tachiki
Female customers - Kujira

Radio CD

Lucky Channel Yattoke! Kōkai Rokuon
 is a public recording of radio program Lucky Channel in Wonder Festival 2007 [Summer]  on August 12, 2007.

Cast

Akira Kogami - Hiromi Konno
Minoru Shiraishi - Minoru Shiraishi
Kagami Hiiragi - Emiri Katō
Tsukasa Hiiragi - Kaori Fukuhara

Comptiq Hen CD

 is a public recording CD of radio program Lucky Channel which was first released on June 10, 2007 with the "Comptiq" July 2007 issue in Japan.

Comp Ace Hen CD

 is a public recording CD of radio program Lucky Channel which was first released on October 26, 2007 with the "Comp Ace" December 2007 issue in Japan.

Comp Heroine's Hen CD

 is a public recording CD of radio program Lucky Channel which was first released on November 26, 2007 with the "Comp H's" vol.7 in Japan.

Lucky Channel New Tokyo Circuit Special

 is a Radio CD based on the radio program Lucky Channel which was first released on May 25, 2011 in Japan. At the variety show Lucky Racer R'' 2nd SP, joint simultaneous recording of "Lucky Channel" and "Lucky Racer" is performed, the talk part is recorded.

Track listing

Cast

Akira Kogami - Hiromi Konno
Minoru Shiraishi - Minoru Shiraishi
Misao Kusakabe - Kaoru Mizuhara
Ayano Minegishi - Mai Aizawa
Sōjirō Izumi - Hirokazu Hiramatsu
Kagami Yoshimizu

References

Anime soundtracks
Film and television discographies
Discographies of Japanese artists
Lantis (company) soundtracks
Albums
Video game music discographies
Video game soundtracks